Shubhashish Mazumder Bappa (born 5 February 1972), commonly known as Bappa Mazumder, is a Bangladeshi singer, lyricist and national film award winner composer. He is the lead singer of the rock band Dalchhut, which he formed in 1996. Bappa is famous for his Bengali romantic compositions and is known as The Melody King of Bangladesh.

Early life and career
Bappa Mazumder was brought up in a musical family. As both of his parents were musicians, he did not need to go outside to learn music. He got his early learning from his family. Later he took a five-year course in classical music at Monihar Sangeet Academy, a music school established by Ustad Barin Mazumder. 'However, I don't feel my training in classical music is adequate and that's why I haven't pursued that genre of music as he mentioned. He came up as a singer for the first time in 1996 with his debut album named "Tokhon Bhor Bela". After that, he has released 13 studio albums and produced more than 200 albums, so far. In recent times he shows himself as an anchor in many TV channels.

Personal life
Bappa Mazumder is the son of a music couple, classical maestro Ustad Barin Mazumder and Ila Mazumder. He is the younger brother of famous mime artist Partha Pratim Majumder and music composer Partha Sharothi Mojumdar. He has been married to Tania Hossain since 23 June 2018 who is an actress and anchor in Bangladeshi media. They have a daughter – Agnimitra Mazumder Pieta. Pieta was born on 18 December 2019

Discography

Singles

Solo Albums

Kothao Keu Nei (1997)

Rater Train (1999)

Je Shohore Tumi Acho (1999)

Dhulo Pora Chithi (2001)

Rath Prohori (2004)

Kodin Porei Chuti (2004)

Din Bari Jay (2006)

Surjo Snane Chol (2008)

Beche Thak Shobuj (2012)

Janina Kon Montorey (2014)

Benananda (2015)

Bendhecchi Amar Pran (2015)

Bappa Mazumder (2016)

Boka Ghuri (2017)

Mixed Albums

Eki Shohore (2002)

Shona Bondhu (2004)

Icche Korei Eksathe (2005)

Tribute to S.D. Burman & R.D. Burman (2006)

Abar Pothe Dekha (2007)

Janala Khule

Shukher Omil (2008)

Bappa with the Rockers (2009)

U (2009)

Poroshpor (2010)

Okaron (2010)

Ek Mutho Gaan 1 (2006)

Ek Mutho Gaan 2 (2010)

Emon Holo Koi (2017)

Beautiful Voices Season One (2022)

Music
 Ekta Golpo (2016)
 ''50 years celebration of Bangladesh National program, 25 March 2021 with Orchestra led by Atul Raninga ( India ), in National Parade ground (2021)
 "Hoye Jao Tumi" - Upcoming (2022)
 Bangla Maaer Nam- A theme song based on Future Bangladesh initiated by BRU Bangladesh. Lyrics by Shahan Kabondho, Tune and Music by Bappa Mazumder. Singers are Bappa Mazumder, Tashfee, Sandhi, Abanti Shithi, Shawn Gaanwala, Antora Rahman & Mustarin Ahmed Sheetal.

References

https://www.dhakapost.com/entertainment/95758?
https://www.prothomalo.com/entertainment/entertainment-interview/%E0%A6%86%E0%A6%AE%E0%A6%BE%E0%A6%B0-%E0%A6%95%E0%A6%BE%E0%A6%9B%E0%A7%87-%E0%A6%AD%E0%A6%BF%E0%A6%89-%E0%A6%AC%E0%A7%9C-%E0%A6%AB%E0%A7%8D%E0%A6%AF%E0%A6%BE%E0%A6%95%E0%A7%8D%E0%A6%9F%E0%A6%B0-%E0%A6%A8%E0%A7%9F?

https://www.dhakapost.com/entertainment/103762?

https://www.banglatribune.com/entertainment/733141/%E0%A6%B9%E0%A7%87%E0%A6%B2%E0%A6%BF%E0%A6%95%E0%A6%AA%E0%A7%8D%E0%A6%9F%E0%A6%BE%E0%A6%B0-%E0%A6%95%E0%A6%BF%E0%A6%A8%E0%A7%87%E0%A6%9B%E0%A7%87%E0%A6%A8-%E0%A6%AC%E0%A6%BE%E0%A6%AA%E0%A7%8D%E0%A6%AA%E0%A6%BE-%E0%A6%AE%E0%A6%9C%E0%A7%81%E0%A6%AE%E0%A6%A6%E0%A6%BE%E0%A6%B0-%E0%A6%AD%E0%A6%BF%E0%A6%A1%E0%A6%BF%E0%A6%93

External links

 

Bangladeshi composers
21st-century Bangladeshi male singers
21st-century Bangladeshi singers
Living people
People from Dhaka
Notre Dame College, Dhaka alumni
Bangladeshi guitarists
Bangladeshi Hindus
20th-century Bangladeshi male singers
20th-century Bangladeshi singers
Best Music Composer National Film Award (Bangladesh) winners
1972 births